Antoni Zygmund wrote a classic two-volume set of books entitled Trigonometric Series, which discusses many different aspects of trigonometric series. The first edition was a single volume, published in 1935  (under the slightly different title Trigonometrical Series). The second edition of 1959 was greatly expanded, taking up two volumes,  though it was later reprinted as a single volume paperback. The third edition of 2002 is similar to the second edition, with the addition of a preface by Robert A. Fefferman on more recent developments, in particular Carleson's theorem about almost everywhere pointwise convergence for square-integrable functions.

Publication history
 At icm.edu.pl: original archived

 Volume I, Volume II.

Reviews

Fourier series
Mathematics books
1935 non-fiction books
1959 non-fiction books
2002 non-fiction books